James D. Garvin (born February 5, 1950) is a retired American basketball player.

A 6'7" forward from Boston University, Garvin was selected by the Buffalo Braves in the 17th round of the 1973 NBA draft and by the Kentucky Colonels in the second round of the 1973 American Basketball Association draft. He played 6 games for the Braves during the 1973–74 NBA season, averaging 0.3 points and 0.8 rebounds per game. Garvin was the only player taken in the last 9 rounds of the 1973 draft who actually appeared in an NBA game. He is a member of the Boston University Hall of Fame.

References 

2. https://goterriers.com/sports/2016/6/13/hallfame-garvin-james-html.aspx

External links 
NBA statistics

1950 births
Living people
American men's basketball players
Boston University Terriers men's basketball players
Buffalo Braves draft picks
Buffalo Braves players
Kentucky Colonels draft picks
Power forwards (basketball)